The Roman Catholic Diocese of Bissau is a diocese located in the city of Bissau in Guinea-Bissau.

History
Pope Pius XII created a Mission “sui iuris” comprising the then overseas colony of Portuguese Guinea on September 4, 1940, until then under the jurisdiction of the Diocese of Santiago de Cabo Verde, in Cape Verde islands. It was promoted to an Apostolic Prefecture on April 29, 1955. After the independence of Guinea-Bissau, on September 10, 1974, it was renamed as Apostolic Prefecture of Guinea-Bissau the January 1st, 1975. The Diocese of Bissau was finally created on 21 March 1977. The first Bishop of the Diocese of Bissau was Italian-born Settimio Ferrazzetta, who held office until his death, at 26 January 1999. He was succeeded by the first Bissau-Guinean native bishop, José Câmnate na Bissign, aged 57 years old. On 13 May 2011 Pope Benedict XVI named Father José Lampra Cá as Auxiliary Bishop-elect of Bissau. Lampra Cá was born in 1964 and ordained a priest in 1997. He was formerly the Rector of the St. Kizito Minor Seminary and Professor of Philosophy at the Major Seminary of Bissau.

Chronology
 September 4, 1940: Established as the Mission “sui iuris” of Portuguese Guinea from the Diocese of Santiago de Cabo Verde in Cape Verde
 April 29, 1955: Promoted as the Apostolic Prefecture of Portuguese Guinea
 January 1, 1975: Renamed as the Apostolic Prefecture of Guinea-Bissau
 March 21, 1977: Promoted to the Diocese of Bissau

Leadership
 Ecclesiastical Superiors of Portuguese Guinea
 Fr. Giuseppe Ribeiro de Magalhães, O.F.M. (1941.06.20 – 1953)
 Fr. Martinho da Silva Carvalhosa, O.F.M. (1953 – 1955.04.29 see below)
 Prefects Apostolic of Portuguese Guinea
 Fr. Martinho da Silva Carvalhosa, O.F.M. (see above 1955.04.29 – 1963)
 Fr. João Ferreira, O.F.M. (1963.01.25 – 1965)
 Fr. Amândio Domingues Neto, O.F.M. (1966.04.04 – 1977)
 Bishops of Bissau
 Bishop Settimio Ferrazzetta, O.F.M. (1977.03.21 – 1999.01.26)
 Bishop José Câmnate na Bissign (1999.10.15 – 2020.07.11)
 Bishop José Lampra Cà (2021.12.10 – ...)

Auxiliary Bishop
José Lampra Cà (2011 – 2021)

See also
Roman Catholicism in Guinea-Bissau
Roman Catholic Diocese of Bafatá

Sources
 GCatholic.org
 Catholic Hierarchy

Roman Catholic dioceses in Guinea-Bissau
Christian organizations established in 2001
Bissau
Roman Catholic dioceses and prelatures established in the 21st century
2001 establishments in Guinea-Bissau
Roman Catholic bishops of Bissau